Panvel Assembly constituency is one of the 288 Vidhan Sabha (legislative assembly) constituencies in Maharashtra state in western India.

Overview
Panvel constituency is one of the seven Vidhan Sabha constituencies located in the Raigad district. and comprises a part of Panvel tehsil of the district.

Panvel is part of the Maval Lok Sabha constituency along with five other Vidhan Sabha segments, namely Karjat and Uran in the Raigad district and Maval, Chinchwad and Pimpri in the Pune district.

Members of Legislative Assembly

Election results

2019 results

2014 results

2009 results

2004 result

See also
 List of constituencies of the Maharashtra Legislative Assembly

Notes

Assembly constituencies of Maharashtra
Politics of Raigad district